The 1997 Temple Owls football team represented Temple University in the 1997 NCAA Division I-A football season; they competed in the Big East Conference. They were led by fifth-year head coach Ron Dickerson. The Owls played their home games at Veterans Stadium and Franklin Field in Philadelphia, Pennsylvania. They finished with a record of 3 wins and 8 losses (3–4 Big East).

Schedule

References

Temple
Temple Owls football seasons
Temple Owls football